Samuel H. Altman (born April 22, 1985) is an American entrepreneur, investor, and programmer. He is the CEO of OpenAI and the former president of Y Combinator. Altman is also the co-founder of Loopt (founded in 2005) and Worldcoin (founded in 2020).

Early life and education  

Altman grew up in St. Louis, Missouri; his mother is a dermatologist. He received his first computer at the age of eight. He was born into a Jewish family. For high school, he attended John Burroughs School and he studied computer science at Stanford University until dropping out in 2005. In 2017, he received an honorary Doctor of Engineering degree from the University of Waterloo.

Career

Loopt  

In 2005, at age 19, Altman co-founded and became CEO of Loopt, a location-based social networking mobile application. After raising more than $30million in venture capital, Loopt was shut down in 2012 after failing to get traction. It was acquired by the Green Dot Corporation for $43.4million.

Y Combinator  

Altman began as a part-time partner at Y Combinator in 2011. In February 2014, Altman was named president of YCombinator by its co-founder, Paul Graham. In a 2014 blog post, Altman said that the total valuation of YCombinator companies had surpassed $65billion, including well-known companies like Airbnb, Dropbox, Zenefits and Stripe. In September 2014, Altman announced that he would become president of YCGroup, which included YCombinator and other units.

Altman said that he hoped to expand YCombinator to fund 1,000 new companies per year. He also tried to expand the types of companies funded by YC, especially "hard technology" companies.

In October 2015, Altman announced YCContinuity, a $700million growth-stage equity fund that invests in YCcompanies. Also in October 2015, Altman announced YCombinator Research, a non-profit research lab, and donated $10million to the group. YC Research has thus far announced research on basic income, the future of computing, education, and building new cities.

Altman was named the top investor under 30 by Forbes magazine in 2015, one of the "Best Young Entrepreneurs in Technology" by Businessweek magazine in 2008 and listed as one of the five most interesting startup founders between 1979 and 2009 by his colleague Paul Graham.

In March 2019, YCannounced Altman's transitioning into a Chairman position to focus more on OpenAI. This decision came shortly after YC announced it would be moving its headquarters to San Francisco. As of early 2020, he was no longer affiliated with YC.

Angel investing  

Altman is an investor in many companies, including Airbnb, Stripe, Reddit, Asana, Pinterest, Teespring, Zenefits, FarmLogs, True North, Shoptiques, Instacart, Optimizely, Verbling, Soylent, Reserve, Vicarious, Clever, Notable PDF (now Kami), and Retro Biosciences.

He was the CEO of Reddit for eight days in 2014 after CEO Yishan Wong resigned. He announced the return of Steve Huffman as CEO on July 10, 2015.

Nuclear energy  

He is chairman of the board for Helion and Oklo, two nuclear energy companies. He has said that nuclear energy is one of the most important areas of technological development.

OpenAI  

Altman is the CEO of OpenAI, which is a capped-profit research company whose goal is to advance artificial intelligence in a way that is most likely to benefit humanity as a whole, rather than cause harm. The organization was initially funded by Altman, Brockman, Elon Musk, Jessica Livingston, Peter Thiel, Amazon Web Services, Infosys, and YCResearch. In total, when the company launched in 2015, it had raised $1billion from outside funders.

Worldcoin  

Altman co-founded Worldcoin in 2020. Worldcoin aims to give its new digital money to every human on Earth for free by using privacy-preserving iris recognition to ensure that its users do not claim their free share more than once. Worldcoin paused its work in multiple countries after local contractors departed or regulations made doing business impossible.

Philanthropy 
During the COVID-19 pandemic Altman helped fund and create Project Covalence which aimed to help researchers rapidly launch clinical trials in partnership with TrialSpark, a clinical trial startup. After the bank failure of Silicon Valley Bank in March 2023, Altman gave money to multiple startups.

Politics 

According to reporting by Vox's Recode, there was speculation that Altman would run for Governor of California in the 2018 election, which he did not enter. In 2018, Altman launched "The United Slate", a political movement focused on fixing housing and healthcare policy.

In 2019, Altman held a fundraiser at his house in San Francisco for Democratic presidential candidate Andrew Yang. In May 2020, Altman donated $250,000 to American Bridge 21st Century, a Super-PAC supporting Democratic presidential candidate Joe Biden.

Personal life 

Altman has been vegetarian since childhood. Altman is gay
and has been out since his teen years. He dated his Loopt co-founder Nick Sivo for nine years before they broke up shortly after the company was acquired.

References

External links

 

21st-century American businesspeople
American computer programmers
20th-century American Jews
Businesspeople in information technology
Living people
American LGBT businesspeople
Stanford University alumni
1985 births
LGBT people from Missouri
Y Combinator people
Businesspeople from St. Louis
Gay businessmen
21st-century American Jews